Moctezuma Serrato Salinas (born 14 September 1976) is a Mexican former professional footballer who played as a striker.

Career
Serrato was a product of the San Luis F.C. youth system. He joined the senior side and helped the club gain promotion to the Mexican Primera División in 2002. He was signed by Club América and made his Primera División debut with the Aguilas in April 2002. He would win the Primera División with América before returning to San Luis in 2003. Six months later, he joined Pumas for two seasons. A short stint with Tecos followed.

Serrato spent the remainder of his 13-year career playing in the lower divisions of Mexico football, with Zacatepec, Lobos de la BUAP and Indios de Ciudad Juárez, and travelling abroad to play for Cienciano in Peru, Defensa y Justicia in Argentina, C.S. Herediano in Costa Rica, and Peñarol La Mesilla and Deportivo Coatepeque in Guatemala. In May 2012, Serrato retired from playing football.

References

External links
 
 
 

1976 births
Living people
San Luis F.C. players
Club América footballers
Club Universidad Nacional footballers
Tecos F.C. footballers
Club Atlético Zacatepec players
Indios de Ciudad Juárez footballers
Cienciano footballers
Defensa y Justicia footballers
C.S. Herediano footballers
Footballers from Morelos
Mexican footballers
Association football forwards